Furcula bicuspis, the alder kitten, is a moth of the family Notodontidae. The species was first described by Moritz Balthasar Borkhausen in 1790. It is found in most of the Palearctic realm.

The wingspan is 30–35 mm. The moths are on wing from May to July depending on the location.

The larvae feed on Betula species and Alnus glutinosa.

External links

Fauna Europaea
Lepidoptera of Belgium
Lepiforum e.V.
De Vlinderstichting 

Notodontidae
Moths of Japan
Moths of Europe
Moths of Asia
Moths described in 1790
Taxa named by Moritz Balthasar Borkhausen